Jerry's Kids is a Boston, Massachusetts, hardcore punk band, formed in 1981, from Braintree, Massachusetts, United States.

The band was named for "the beneficiaries of the Jerry Lewis telethon". Their first recorded output was on the Modern Method This Is Boston, Not L.A. compilation LP in 1982. They contributed six tracks along with other early Boston hardcore band Gang Green.

Frontman Bryan Jones and rhythm guitar player Dave Aronson left the band early on. Bryan Jones had broken his leg at one of their gigs and his parents denied him permission to play in the band any further. Bassist Rick Jones (Bryan's brother) switched to vocals and Chris Doherty of Gang Green took over on rhythm guitar. It was this line-up that recorded the classic 12 song LP Is This My World? on X-Claim in 1983, featuring songs such as "Cracks In The Wall", "Build Me A Bomb" and "Vietnam Syndrome".

Is This My World? was rewieved by Pushead in Maximumrocknroll: "An adventure into hyperactive, full-tilt, bulldozing quickness and thundering power. This overwhelming supply of burning rapid-fire speed destroys the mold, exploding into maniac doses of invincible strength and energy. Bolting drums, high-velocity crooning, and hysterically blistering wild guitars (featuring ex-GANG GREEN axeman Chris Doherty). JERRY’S KIDS totally shred the eardrums to mincemeat. For the fast fanatic’s cravings; the essence of what other will try to duplicate". Trouser Press called the album "a hardcore classic". In Europe, Ox-Fanzine gave the album 8/10.

They broke up in 1985, but reformed in 1987 with a more speed metal sound and released an LP on Taang! Records entitled Kill Kill Kill. Reflex/Wolfpack Records released a limited re-issue of the Is This My World? LP in 2002. The band reunited again in 2004 and has been playing several shows per year around Boston since then.

Lineups

Before 1981 
Bob Cenci – guitar
Karl Jacobson – guitar
Eric Saganov – Drums
Rick Jones – bass

1981–1982
Bryan Jones – vocals
Bob Cenci – guitar
Dave Aronson – guitar
Rick Jones – bass
Brian Betzger – drums

1982
Rick Jones – vocals and bass
Bob Cenci – guitar
Dave Aronson – guitar
Brian Betzger – drums

1982–1984
Rick Jones – vocals and bass
Bob Cenci – guitar
Chris Doherty – guitar
Brian Betzger – drums
Joseph Orangio - vocals

1986
Rick Jones – vocals and bass
Bob Cenci – guitar
Dave Aronson – guitar
Mike Dean – drums

1986–1990
Rick Jones – vocals and bass
Bob Cenci – guitar
Dave Aronson – guitar
Jack Clark – drums

1994 (Reunion Show at Bill's Bar)
 Rick Jones – vocals and bass
 Bob Cenci – guitar
 Chris Doherty – guitar
 Brian Betzger – drums

2004–present
Rick Jones – vocals and bass
Bob Cenci – guitar
Ross Luongo – guitar
Jack Clark – drums

Discography

Studio albums
 Is This My World? (1983)
 Kill Kill Kill (1989)

References

External links
Suburban Voice Interview  – Jerry's Kids interview from 1982
KFTH Jerry's Kids Kill From The Heart page on Jerry's Kids
 Reflex/Wolfpack Records page on Discogs

Hardcore punk groups from Massachusetts
Musical groups from Boston